Bastilla copidiphora  is a moth of the family Noctuidae. It is found in New Guinea and Australia.

References

Bastilla (moth)
Moths described in 1913